Symphony Mall is a shopping mall in Bhubaneswar, India which opened on 1 April 2019. The mall has three shopping levels, two parking levels, and an entertainment and food court level. Symphony Mall is one of the commercial joint developments of Oorjita Projects and Trident Properties. The project offers commercial shops at very competitive and affordable prices. The site is well connected by different modes of transportation and is nearby to various civic utilities. The project is well equipped with all modern amenities and a 24 x 7 security service to facilitate the business needs.

FEATURES 

 Service lifts 
 Two levels of parking 
 Common toilets on each floor 
 Sprinklers and smoke detectors in common area

References

Shopping malls in Bhubaneswar
2019 establishments in Odisha
Shopping malls established in 2019